Howard Guerin le Peton (19 January 1895 in Pwllheli, Wales – 19 September 1981 in Wisbech, Cambridgeshire, England) was a Welsh-born Irish cricketer. A right-handed batsman, he played just once for the Ireland cricket team, a first-class match against Scotland in August 1921.

He served with the Royal Dublin Fusiliers during the First World War.

References

1895 births
1981 deaths
Welsh cricketers
Ireland cricketers
People from Wisbech
Royal Dublin Fusiliers officers
British Army personnel of World War I